Dr Paula Barrett is a clinician, scholar, researcher and professor in the field of child psychology. She has been recognised as being amongst the top 1 percent of publishers within the field of Psychology and Psychiatry at an international level. 

Dr Barrett is the author of the FRIENDS Programs, cognitive behaviour therapy (CBT) based programs, endorsed by the World Health Organization, as best practice for the prevention and treatment of anxiety and depression, promoting resilience in families, schools and communities. 

Dr Barrett is the director of Friends Resilience Pty and is Adjunct Professor in the School of Psychology at Edith Cowan University.

In 2009, The Highly Commended certificate for the Human Rights Medal for 2009 went to DR Paula Barrett.

Life
Paula Barrett was born in Angola, Africa and spent a good part of her early life moving around in Mozambique, Macao and other places. In 1986 Paula's family migrated to Australia from Portugal.

Education
 Doctor of Philosophy (1995), the University of Queensland 
 Master of Clinical Psychology (1990), the University of Queensland 
 Licenciatura in Clinical Psychology (1986), University of Lisbon 
 Bachelor of Science (First Class Honours) (1983), University of Lisbon

Programs
For over two decades, Paula has continued to develop and evaluate the world-renowned FRIENDS programs:
 Fun Friends
 Friends for Life
 My Friends Youth
 Adult Resilience Program
She has also developed the FOCUS program for working with children with Obsessive Compulsive Disorder, which has demonstrated efficacy for up to 7 years follow-up.

In 2020 and in response to the COVID-19 pandemic, Paula Barrett developed and launched a Family / Community Package, designed to provide coping skills to families during times of adversity. This package has been used globally and receives positive feedback from participants.

Awards
 2009 Highly Commended Certificate, Human Rights Medal 	Australian Human Rights Commission
 2008 Telstra Queensland Business Woman of the Year Telstra
 2008 Australian of the Year Award, Queensland, Finalist
 1999 Early Career Award, Australian Psychological Society for outstanding scholarship in Psychology. 
 Tracey Goodall Early Career Award, Australian Association of Cognitive Behaviour Therapy

References

Australian educational theorists
Academic staff of the University of Queensland
Living people
Year of birth missing (living people)